This is a list of Knights Grand Commander (Knights 1861-1866) of the Most Exalted Order of the Star of India from 1861 until 1947, when the order ceased to be awarded. The Viceroy of India served as ex-officio Grand Master of the Order, and was automatically appointed as a Knight Grand Commander upon taking office.

1860s
1861-1866: See List of Knights Companion of the Order of the Star of India

1867
His Highness Maharajadhiraja Shri Sir Jawansinhji Gambhirsinhji Sahib Bahadur, Maharaja of Idar

1869
His Highness Bhagwant Singh, Maharaj Rana of Dholpur

1870s

1870
His Highness Mahendra Singh, Maharaja of Patiala  
The Nawab Salar Jung Bahadoor,  Minister of the Hyderabad State

1871
His Highness Dheraj Sumbho Sing, Maharana of Oodeypore
His Highness Pragmuljee, Rao of Cutch

1872
Her Highness the Nawab Shah Jehan, Begum of Bhopal

1873
His Excellency Maharajah Jung Bahadoor Kunwar Ranajee
General Sir John Low
Lieutenant-General Sir Neville Bowles Chamberlain

1877
Field-Marshal His Royal Highness George William Frederick Charles, Duke of Cambridge

1880s

1881
His Highness Sujjun Singh, Maharana of Udaipur

1882
His Highness Visakham Thirunal, Maharajah of Travancore
His Highness Nawab Ikbal-ud-dowlah of Oudh (Baghdad)

1884
His Highness Chama Rajendra Wadeir, Maharajah of Mysore

1888
His Highness Moolam Thirunal, Maharajah of Travancore.

1890s

1892
Colonel His Highness Pratap Singh, Maharaja of Jammu and Kashmir.

1893
General Frederick Sleigh, Baron Roberts of Kandahar

1895
His Highness Madho Rao, Maharaja Scindia of Gwalior 
The Right Honourable George Robert Canning, Baron Harris
His Highness Rajarshi Shahu, Maharaj of Kolhapur
The Right Honourable Henry Hartley Fowler

1896
(Extra) The Right Honourable Beilby Lawley, 3rd Baron Wenlock

1897
His Highness Vyankatesh Raman Singh Bahadur, Maharaja of Rewa.
Sir Joseph Dalton Hooker
Maharaja Sir Bir Bhamsber Jang Rana Bahadur
Sir Antony Patrick MacDonnell
His Highness Lieutenant Colonel Sir Partab Singh Bahadur, Maharaja of Idar
Lieutenant-General Richard Strachey

1898
His Highness Rajinder Singh, Maharaja of Patiala.

1900s

1900
His Highness Maharao Umed Singh Bahadur, of Kotah.

1903
The Right Honourable George Francis Hamilton
His Highness Sir Shri Rama Varma, Rajarshi of Cochin

1905
His Excellency Maharaja Chandra Shamsher Jang, Rana Bahadur, Prime Minister of Nepal.

1906
His Highness Pratap Singh Bahadur, Maharaja Ju Deo of Orchha

1907
His Highness Sri Krishnaraja Wadiar Bahadur, Maharaja of Mysore.

1909
His Highness Sir Rasul Khanji Mahabbat Khanji, Nawab of Junagarh.
His Excellency General The Right Honourable Horatio Herbert, Viscount Kitchener of Khartoum

1910s

1910
Her Highness Nawab Sultan Jahan Begam, Begum of Bhopal
His Highness Sir Sardar Singh Bahadur, Maharaja of Jodhpur

1911
Sir Steuart Colvin Bayley
Sir Dennis Fitzpatrick
Sir William Lee-Warner
General Sir Dighton MacNaghten Probyn
His Excellency Sir George Sydenham Clarke
The Right Honourable Sir Arthur Lawley
Sir John Prescott Hewett
Colonel His Highness Sri Sir Gunga Singh Bahadur, Maharaja of Bikaner
His Highness Major Sir Umed Singh Bahadur, Maharao of Kotah
His Excellency General Sir Garrett O'Moore Creagh
His Highness Farzand-i-Dilband Raish-ul-Itikad Daulat-i-Inglisbia Raja-i-Rajagan Raja Sir Jagatjit Singh, Bahadur Ahluwalia of Kapurthala.
His Highness Asafjah Muzaffer-ul-Mulk-Maamalik Nizam-ul-Mulk Nizam-ud-Daula Nawab Mir Usman Ali Khan, Bahadur Fateh Jang, the 7th Nizam of Hyderabad.
His Highness Sir Sultan Muhammad Shah Aga Khan

1912
His Highness Amin-ud-Daula Wazir-ul-Mulk Nawab Sir Muhammad Ibrahim Ali Khan, Bahadur, Saulat Jang of Tonk

1916
His Excellency General Sir Beauchamp Duff

1917
His Highness Maharao Raja Sawai Sir Khengarji Bahadur Rao of Cutch.

1918
His Excellency The Right Honourable Sir John Sinclair, Baron Pentland
His Excellency Sir Freeman Freeman-Thomas, Baron Willingdon

1919
His Excellency General Sir Sir Charles Monro, 1st Baronet
His Highness Sir Raghubir Singh Bahadur, Maharao of Bundi
George Carmichael
Michael Ernest Sadler

1920s

1921
Colonel His Highness Alhijah Farzand-i-Dilpazir-i-Daulat-i-Inglisihia, Mukhlis-ud-Daula Nasir-ul-Mulk Amir-ul-Umra Nawab Sir Hamid Ali Khan Bahadur, Nawab of Rampur
 Lieutenant-Colonel His Highness Sir Prabhu Narayan Singh Bahadur, Maharaja of Benares.
 Major-General His Highness Farzand-i-Khas-i-Daulet-i-Inglishia Mansur-i-Zaman Amar-ul-Umra Maharajadhiraja Rajeshwar Sri Maharaja-i-Rajagan Sir Bhupindar Singh Mahindar Bahadur, Maharaja of Patiala.

1923
 His Highness Lieutenant-Colonel Shri Sir Ranjitsinhji Vibhaji, Maharaja Jam Sahib

1924
Colonel His Highness Sewai Maharaj Shri Jey Singh, Maharaja of Alwar
James Lyle, Viscount Inchcape
 General Henry Seymour, Baron Rawlinson of Trent

1925
The Right Honourable Victor Alexander George Robert, Earl of Lytton
 The Right Honourable Arthur Hamilton, Viscount Lee of Fareham

1928
Sir Spencer Harcourt Butler

1929
 Lieutenant-Colonel and Honorary Colonel, George Joachim, Viscount Goschen of Hawkhurst
Lieutenant-Colonel The Right Honourable Sir Leslie Orme Wilson

1930s

1930
 The Right Honourable Sir John Allsebrook Simon
 Field-Marshal Sir Claud William Jacob
Field Marshal Sir William Riddell Birdwood

1931
His Highness Sir Bhupal Singh Bahadur, Maharaja of Udaipur
Lieutenant-Colonel His Highness Shri Sir Rajaram Chhatrapati, Maharaja of Kolhapur
Major-General His Highness Projjwal-Nepal Tara-Dhish Sri Sri Sri Maharaja Sir Bhim Shumsher Jang Bahadur Rana.

1932
 Lieutenant-Colonel His Highness Iftikhar-ul-Mulk Sikandar Saulat Haji Sir Muhammad Hamidullah Khan Bahadur, Nawab of Bhopal.
 Sir William Malcolm Hailey
The Right Honourable William Robert Wellesley, Earl Peel

1933
Colonel His Highness Sir Hari Singh Indar Mahindar Bahadur, Maharaja of Jammu and Kashmir.

1934
 Lieutenant-Colonel the Right Honourable Sir George Frederick Stanley
 Field-Marshal Sir Philip Walhouse Chetwode
Lieutenant-Colonel the Right Honourable Sir Samuel John Gurney Hoare

1935
Lieutenant-General His Highness Ojaswi Rajanya Projjwala Nepala Tara Ati Pravala Gorkha Dakshina Bahu Prithuladheesha Sri Sri Sri Maharaja Sir Juddha Shumsher Jang Bahadur Rana

1936
 Lieutenant-Colonel Raj Rajeshwar Maharajadhiraja Sir Umaid Singh Bahadur, Maharaja of Jodhpur

1937
His Highness Maharaja Shri Sir Bhagwatsinhji Sagramji, Maharaja of Gondal
Ranbir Singh, the Maharaja of Jind

1940s

1940
General Sir Robert Archibald Cassels

1941
Major His Highness Rukn-ud-Daula Nusrat-i-Jang, Saif-ud-Daula Hafiz-ul-Mulk Mukhlis-ud-Daula wa Muin-ud-Daula Nawab al Haj Sir Sadiq Muhammad Khan, Nawab of Bahawalpur.

1946
Lieutenant-Colonel His Highness Maharaja Mukhtar-ul-Mulk, Asim-ul-Iqtidar, Rafi-ush-Shan, Wala Shikoh Mohta-Sham-i-Dauran, Umdat-ul-Umra, Maharajadhi-Raja Alijah Hisam-us-Sultanat, Sir George Jivaji Rao, Maharaja Scindia of Gwalior.
Lieutenant-Colonel His Highness Maharaja Sri Padmanabha Dasa Vanchi Pala Sir Bala Rama Varma, Maharaja of Travancore

1947
 Colonel His Highness Shri Sir Digvijaysinhji, Maharaja Jam Saheb of Nawanagar.

1948
 His Excellency Lieutenant-General Sir Archibald Edward Nye
 His Excellency Sir Frederick John Burrows
 Major His Highness Maharaja Sir Shahaji Chhatrapati, Maharaja of Kolhapur.
 Lieutenant-General His Highness Saramad-i-Rajaha-i-Hindustan Raj Rajindra Sri Maharajadhiraja Sawar Sir Man Singhji, Maharaja of Jaipur.
 Lieutenant-General His Highness Maharajadhiraja Raj Rajeshwar Shiromani Shri Sir Sadul Singhji Bahadur, Maharajah of Bikaner

Honorary Knights Grand Commander
1868: Isma'il Pasha, Khedive of Egypt
1870: Ferdinand de Lesseps
1873: Mirza Hosein Khan Moshir od-Dowleh, Grand Vizier of Persia
1875: Tewfik Pasha of Egypt
1878: Muhammad Sharif Pasha, Minister of Foreign Affairs of Egypt, Saffet Pasha, Grand Vizier of the Ottoman Empire 
1879: Khudadad Khan, Khan of Kalat
1885: Abdur Rahman Khan, Emir of Afghanistan
1887: Mass'oud Mirza Zell-e Soltan, Governor-General of Isfahan, Arabistan, Kurdistan, Yazd, etc.
1890: Ali bin Said of Zanzibar, Sultan of Zanzibar
1894: Hamad bin Thuwaini of Zanzibar, Sultan of Zanzibar
1896: Nubar Pasha
1909: Prince Auguste Louis Alberic d'Arenberg, President of the Suez Canal Company
1935: Maharaja Juddha Shamsher Jang Bahadur Rana, Prime Minister of Nepal
1945: Padma Shamsher Jang Bahadur Rana, Commander-in-Chief, Nepalese Army

References

See also
Order of the Star of India

 
Star of India